Hermanna Molkenboer-Trip (1851–1911), was a Dutch industrialist.

She was the daughter of lawyer Scato Trip (1807–1871) and Martha Cornelia Blok (1825–1867). In 1875 she married Johannes Hermanus Molkenboer (1845–1892), owner of the major textile industry JH Molkenboer jr i Oldenzaal in Twente. She became the company's managing director when she was widowed in 1892. Her company provided linen to the dowry of the queen upon the royal wedding in 1901, and was given a royal warrant in 1902.

She participated in the national exhibition of women's work, Nationale Tentoonstelling van Vrouwenarbeid 1898, a major milestone in the Dutch women's movement. There, she became engaged in feminism, particularly the Victorian dress reform, and famously had reform dresses made by her company.

She left the company to her daughter.

References 

1851 births
1911 deaths
19th-century Dutch businesswomen
19th-century Dutch businesspeople
20th-century Dutch businesswomen
20th-century Dutch businesspeople
Dutch women's rights activists